The Baldhead River is a river in the Lake Superior drainage basin in Algoma District in Northwestern Ontario, Canada. It is located entirely within Lake Superior Provincial Park.

Course
The river begins at Baldhead Lake adjacent to the Mijinemungshing Lake			
parking area and heads west then southwest along the Mijinemungshing Road. It passes under the road, then turns south and parallels Ontario Highway 17. It takes in the left tributary East Branch Baldhead River, continues south and roughly parallel to Ontario Highway 17, and reaches its mouth near the headland named Bald Head on Lake Superior. The Orphan Lake Trail passes along the mouth of the river.

See also
List of rivers of Ontario

References

Sources

External links 

Rivers of Algoma District
Tributaries of Lake Superior